Ridott is a village in Stephenson County, Illinois, United States. As of the 2010 census, the village population was 164, up from 158 in 2000.

History
Originally called Cochranville, Ridott was renamed in 1863 after Ridott Township. A post office was established as Cochranville in 1860, and renamed Ridott in 1861.

Geography

Ridott is located at  (42.297101, -89.476529).

Demographics

As of the census of 2000, there were 159 people, 62 households, and 47 families residing in the village. The racial makeup of the village was 100.00% White.

There were 62 households, out of which 35.5% had children under the age of 18 living with them, 71.0% were married couples living together, 4.8% had a female householder with no husband present, and 22.6% were non-families. 17.7% of all households were made up of individuals, and 9.7% had someone living alone who was 65 years of age or older. The average household size was 2.56 and the average family size was 2.94.

In the village, the population was spread out, with 25.8% under the age of 18, 4.4% from 18 to 24, 32.1% from 25 to 44, 24.5% from 45 to 64, and 13.2% who were 65 years of age or older. The median age was 40 years. For every 100 females, there were 114.9 males. For every 100 females age 18 and over, there were 103.4 males.

The median income for a household in the village was $41,875, and the median income for a family was $46,042. Males had a median income of $29,750 versus $19,583 for females. The per capita income for the village was $16,846. None of the families and 2.9% of the population were living below the poverty line, including no under eighteens and 12.9% of those over 64.

References

External links
Stephenson County

Villages in Stephenson County, Illinois
Villages in Illinois